Iskandera is a genus of flowering plants belonging to the family Brassicaceae.

Its native range is Central Asia.

Species:
 Iskandera hissarica N.Busch

References

Brassicaceae
Brassicaceae genera